WARX (93.9 FM) is a non-commercial radio station in Lewiston, Maine that features Worship Music programming from Air 1. It is under ownership of the Educational Media Foundation.

The station (at that time WCYI), along with co-owned WCLZ, was transferred to The Last Bastion Station Trust, LLC, due to parent company Citadel Broadcasting buying out ABC Radio. The station kept the Opie & Anthony Show . In October 2007 Saga Communications bought WCLZ, dropping the simulcast but keeping the Opie & Anthony Show, thus resulting in WCYI programming an automated Blues format in October 2007.

The station has had several previous on-air slogans including Eagle 94 as an oldies formatted station. It also simulcasted WCYY for over 10 years until the transfer to The Last Bastion Station Trust, LLC, when it switched to a simulcast of WCLZ.

On February 21, 2008, it was announced that the Educational Media Foundation bought WCYI for a reported $1 million. In early March 2008 it was report that WCYI would likely become an affiliate of EMF's K-Love contemporary Christian music format. However, later the same month, it was reported  that the station would carry Air 1 (sister network to K-Love) according to EMF's vice president of communications.  On August 15, 2008, the station changed its call letters to WARX.

References

External links

Contemporary Christian radio stations in the United States
Air1 radio stations
Radio stations established in 1948
ARX
1948 establishments in Maine
Educational Media Foundation radio stations
ARX